Utagawa Toyokuni II (1777–1835), also known as Toyoshige, was a designer of ukiyo-e Japanese woodblock prints in Edo.  He was the pupil, son-in-law and adopted son of Toyokuni I.  The former used the name Toyoshige (豊重) until 1826, the year after his teacher's death, when the family gave him the right to use his teacher's name and he began signing his work Toyokuni (豊国). In 1835 he died, and in 1844 the family persuaded Kunisada, the most famous student of Toyokuni I, to use the name "Toyokuni" and become leader of the school. Although Kunisada never recognised Toyoshige's right to the name Toyokuni, nevertheless Kunisada after 1844 is always referred to as Toyokuni III.

Toyokuni I, Toyokuni II (Toyoshige), and Toyokuni III (Kunisada) each used the signature Toyokuni (豊国).  The signature of Toyokuni II is easiest to distinguish by the chalice-shaped toyo (豊) kanji (see figure). 
 
Toyoshige's students include Utagawa Kunimatsu, Utagawa Kunishige II, Utagawa Kuniteru III, and Utagawa Kunitsuru I.

Legacy
Works by Utagawa Toyokuni II are held in the Library of Congress, including the work The Sumo Wrestler Kagamiiwa of the West Side.

Gallery

References

Notes

Cited works

 Lane, Richard. (1978).  Images from the Floating World, The Japanese Print. Oxford: Oxford University Press. ; OCLC 5246796
 Newland, Amy Reigle. (2005). Hotei Encyclopedia of Japanese Woodblock Prints.  Amsterdam: Hotei. ; OCLC 61666175 

1777 births
1835 deaths
Ukiyo-e artists
Toyokuni II